Harpanthus is a genus of liverworts belonging to the family Geocalycaceae.

The genus was first described by Christian Gottfried Daniel Nees von Esenbeck in 1836.

Species:
 Harpanthus drummondii (Taylor) Grolle
 Harpanthus flotovianus (Nees) Nees
 Harpanthus scutatus (F. Weber & D. Mohr) Spruce

References

Jungermanniales
Jungermanniales genera